Alfred Hess (19 May 1879 – 24 December 1931) was a German Jewish industrialist and art collector.

Career

Hess was a shoe manufacturer in Erfurt, Thuringia. M & L Hess Schuhfabrik had four factories in Erfurt. He was keen on art and German expressionism. His portrait was made into a woodcut by Max Pechstein in 1919 when he was one of the artists who stayed at the Hess house. Hess made donations to local museums and his visitors' books were so lavishly decorated that illustrations were published as a book in 1957. Hess's factory was forcibly Aryanised under the Nazis.

A memorial plaque for Alfred Hess has been erected at the Hess villa in Alfred-Hess-Straße, Erfurt; the street was named after him in 1992.

Art collection
With his wife Thekla (1884–1968), née Pauson, he had an art collection of around 4,000 works that contained important German Expressionist works and was looted by the Nazis in the 1930s. After her husband's death in 1931, Thekla sold some of the paintings to fund a grand tour with her son Hans Hess. She moved to the UK in 1938 and helped Leicester Museum and Art Gallery create an exhibition of German Expressionist art in 1944. Leicester Museum bought or was given four paintings. Hans Hess was appointed as an art assistant at Leicester shortly before the exhibition opened, then in 1947, he became keeper of art at York Art Gallery.

Hans tried to sell some of the paintings after the end of the Second World War but there were no buyers. There was an auction of family paintings at the Marlborough Gallery in 1977 following the death of Hans in 1975 and his widow Lillie in 1976.

Several works, such as Berlin Street Scene (1913) by Ernst Ludwig Kirchner and Nude by Karl Schmidt-Rottluff, have been returned to his granddaughter and heir, Anita Halpin, and subsequently sold; the former sold at auction for £20.5 million to the Neue Galerie New York, which also paid over £1 million to Halpin for Nude.

References 

German art collectors
1931 deaths
1879 births
19th-century German Jews
German industrialists
Businesspeople from Erfurt
Jewish art collectors